Formula One: Built to Win is a 1990 racing video game for the Nintendo Entertainment System developed by Winky Soft and published by SETA Corporation.

It was one of the first racing games to feature a career mode, multiple vehicles and an opportunity for the player to increase the performance of their in-game car through car tuning, which were unique elements for a racer of the NES era and a genre only truly revisited during the fifth generation of game consoles where games such as Gran Turismo became popular.

Races start out as single-lap events but become double-lap events as the player starts racing against more experienced competition in places like Las Vegas, Nevada and Hawaii. With gameplay similar to Rad Racer and Pole Position, the driver races towards the back of the screen.

The names of the opponents are chosen partially at random; they can also vary because of the ranking level of the course and the type of vehicle used.

Gameplay

Once the player enters a user name, the player has to start out driving a Mini Cooper without an international racing license. From there, the player must earn the rankings needed to get better performing vehicles and automobile parts. These cars consist of the Vector W2, the Ferrari F40 and finally a Formula-1 race car; most of the game is driven with these vehicles.

Drivers must also be prepared to negotiate their way through both civilian traffic (green) and other racers (blue), both of which resemble whatever car that the player is driving at that time; for example, the Mini Cooper-based opponents appear to be 1990 Volkswagen Beetles.

Managing a racing career

The player starts in New York and must work towards the West Coast. All of tracks that make up the Formula One portion of the game are actual Formula One tracks from around the world. Elements from the 1990 and 1991 Formula One seasons have been used for this video game.

Because this game is based on the career of a race car driver who is trying to go from "Rags to Riches," the beginning of the game provides a slow and conservative period. Designing an unbeatable car from the parts that they purchased in parts shops helps improve the handling, acceleration, braking, and maximum speed of their vehicle. It is possible to develop millionaire or even multimillionaire race car drivers by being successful at the slot machine game at the Las Vegas portion of the game which may be visited at any time. Even though the player must manually turn his or her entire bank account into casino tokens, the casino tokens are automatically turned back into "dollars" after the player leaves the casino.

The player must earn money in order to keep racing; this is done by either winning races or finishing in podium position. After winning the race, the money must be invested in faster and/or more efficient parts to improve the performance of the vehicle. Having a more efficient racing vehicle will eventually result in winning more difficult races where the winner's prize is higher than in the easier races. Eventually, winning certain races will result in acquiring an international racing license. Parts in the game vary in cost and tires can only be used a limited number of times before they have to be purchased again. Tires that have the worst handling can be used an unlimited number of times. These tires are the only automobile parts that are free and the player automatically starts out with these at the beginning of the game's "career mode."

Other modes
In addition to the career (normal) mode of the game, there is also a "free mode" of the game that allows unlimited use of all four vehicles on their respective tracks. These races are done without the distraction of other vehicles.

All races in "free mode" are single-lap only. There is still a limited amount of nitro like in the "normal mode" of the game. However, all races done under "free mode" always start with the nitro gauge filled up. New time records made in the "free mode" are saved into the game's battery along with the driver's name until they are broken by another player. Once the player reaches the Formula One level, he or she must race against drivers whose names sound similar to the actual drivers of the 1990 and 1991 Formula One seasons. For example, Satoru Nakajima is known in the game as S.Nakazma.

See also

 Taito Grand Prix: Eikou heno License; a Japanese-exclusive video game released by Taito three years prior to the release of this game that shares most of the concepts with this game

Notes

1990 video games
Video games set in Colorado
Formula One video games
North America-exclusive video games
Nintendo Entertainment System games
Nintendo Entertainment System-only games
Racing video games set in the United States
SETA Corporation games
Sports video games set in the United States
Sports video games with career mode
Video games developed in Japan
Video games set in the 1990s
Video games set in California
Video games set in Dallas
Video games set in Detroit
Video games set in the Las Vegas Valley
Video games set in Hawaii
Video games set in Miami
Video games set in Canada
Video games set in France
Video games set in Japan
Video games set in Monaco
Video games set in Spain
Video games set in the United Kingdom
Winkysoft games
Video games set in Nevada